A cranial fossa is formed by the floor of the cranial cavity.

There are three distinct cranial fossae:

 Anterior cranial fossa (fossa cranii anterior), housing the projecting frontal lobes of the brain
 Middle cranial fossa (fossa cranii media), separated from the posterior fossa by the clivus and the petrous crest housing the temporal lobe
 Posterior cranial fossa (fossa cranii posterior), between the foramen magnum and tentorium cerebelli, containing the brainstem and cerebellum

Additional images

See also 

 Anatomical terms of location#Cranial and caudal
 Fossa (anatomy)

Brain anatomy